Scottville (formerly, Flint Hill) is an unincorporated community in both Ashe and Alleghany Counties, North Carolina, United States, on U.S. Route 221. It lies at an elevation of 2,861 feet (872 m).  The ZIP Code for Scottville is 28672.

The Bower-Cox House and Samuel Cox House are listed on the National Register of Historic Places.

References

Unincorporated communities in Alleghany County, North Carolina
Unincorporated communities in Ashe County, North Carolina
Unincorporated communities in North Carolina